Han Qingling (born 16 December 1960) is a Chinese basketball player. She competed in the women's tournament at the 1988 Summer Olympics.

References

1960 births
Living people
Chinese women's basketball players
Olympic basketball players of China
Basketball players at the 1988 Summer Olympics
Place of birth missing (living people)
Asian Games medalists in basketball
Asian Games gold medalists for China
Basketball players at the 1986 Asian Games
Medalists at the 1986 Asian Games